Roger Moran is a British hillclimb driver, who won the British Hillclimb Championship in 1997. In recent years he has shared a car with his son Scott.

References

Living people
British hillclimb drivers
Year of birth missing (living people)